Do What You Like may refer to:
 "Do What U Like", a 1991 song by Take That
 "Doowutchyalike", a 1989 song by Digital Underground
 "Do What You Like", a song by Foreigner from their 1979 album Head Games
 "Do What You Like", a song by Blind Faith, from their 1969 album Blind Faith
 "Do What You Like", a 2000 song by French Affair
 "Do What You Like" (Taio Cruz song), 2015

See also
Do What You Want (disambiguation)